Meganthribus pupa is a species of beetles belonging to the Anthribidae family.

Description 
The basic colour is pale brown with dark brown or black markings.

Distribution 
This species occurs in Papua New Guinea and Philippines.

References 

 Universal Biological Indexer
 Biostor
 Oriental Anthribidae

Anthribidae
Beetles described in 1895